Tup Qarah may refer to:
 Tup Qarah, East Azerbaijan
 Tup Qarah, Zanjan